Pure Comedy is the third studio album by American folk musician Josh Tillman under his pseudonym Father John Misty. Its release was announced on January 23, 2017. It was released on April 7, 2017 on Bella Union in the UK and Europe and on Sub Pop in the rest of the world. This is Tillman's third studio album since his departure from Fleet Foxes. It was produced by Josh Tillman in collaboration with Jonathan Wilson, sound engineer Trevor Spencer and composer/double-bassist Gavin Bryars.

Production

Songwriting
Most of Pure Comedy was written in 2015. It touches on themes of progress, technology, fame, the environment, politics, aging, social media, human nature, human connection and his own role in it all. Tillman included an 1800-word-long essay about its symbolism and meaning in the release announcement email to his fan club. Pure Comedy is the story of a species born with a half-formed brain. The species’ only hope for survival, finding itself on a cruel, unpredictable rock surrounded by other species who seem far more adept at this whole thing (and to whom they are delicious), is the reliance on other, slightly older, half-formed brains. This reliance takes on a few different names as their story unfolds, like “love,” “culture,” “family,” etc. Over time, and as their brains prove to be remarkably good at inventing meaning where there is none, the species becomes the purveyor of increasingly bizarre and sophisticated ironies. These ironies are designed to help cope with the species’ loathsome vulnerability and to try and reconcile how disproportionate their imagination is to the monotony of their existence.

Recording
Pure Comedy was recorded in March 2016 at United Recording Studios in Los Angeles. Its basic tracking and vocals were recorded live, in no more than two takes each. It was mixed by Tillman, Wilson and sound engineer Trevor Spencer, and mastered by Bob Ludwig at Gateway Mastering Studios. Featured instruments include strings and horns. Bryars, along with additional contributors Nico Muhly and Thomas Bartlett, provided choral arrangements.

Promotion

Short film
In light of the album announcement, Tillman released his 25-minute short film Pure Comedy: The Film, captured by a six-person room throughout the recording of the album. He co-directed with Grant James. It is a monochromatic depiction of the live tracking and Tillman’s writing process.

Singles
The single "Pure Comedy" was released on January 23, 2017 with a music video animated by Matthew Daniel Siskin featuring snippets of popular Internet videos.

The album's second single, "Two Wildly Different Perspectives", was released with a music video also animated by Siskin, and also containing popular videoclips, on January 30, 2017.

The third single released was "Ballad of the Dying Man" on February 1, 2017.

The fourth single, "Total Entertainment Forever", was released on the night it was performed on Saturday Night Live (along with "Pure Comedy") on March 4, 2017.

Other music videos
On April 26, 2017, a music video produced by Adam Green was released for "Total Entertainment Forever". It features a crucified Macaulay Culkin as Kurt Cobain seen in a virtual reality world pictured in papier-mâché.

Jacknife Films , a production company best known for their work on Radiohead's "Burn the Witch" and Run the Jewels's "Don't Get Captured" music videos, took on the project of a music video for "Things It Would Have Been Helpful To Know Before the Revolution" that was released on August 3, 2017.

Pure Comedy world tour
The Pure Comedy world tour, initially meant to be in the form of a musical, began in April 2017 and continued until early 2018.

Critical reception

Pure Comedy received acclaim from critics. On Metacritic, which assigns a normalized rating out of 100 to reviews from mainstream publications, the album received an average score of 85, based on 36 reviews, which signifies "universal acclaim". A review from The Record Store Clerk remarked that "Pure Comedy (shows) a mature artist proving that he can continue to make music at the top of his game and likely will for years to come." In a highly positive review for Chorus.fm, Aaron Mook writes, "Pure Comedy is a gorgeous album, an album that will remain important in the context of Tillman’s career, but above all things, it’s a genuine album. Sometimes, it’s hard to empathize with someone who refuses to tell you what you want to hear – especially if what they’re saying is true." Writing for No Depression, John Amen also offered high praise, calling Pure Comedy Tillman's "most ambitious, cohesive, and provocative release to date."

However, the album did divide some critics. No Ripcord gave the album a 4/10, saying "One of the most frustrating releases of recent times. Tracks meander insipidly, crushed by the weight of a solipsistic 'message' and the real moments of quality only serve as a reminder of what might have been." Spin stated, "He’s not really in a fun mood, and the music follows. The lushness has diminished, and the work evokes increasing comparisons to ‘70s singer-songwriters like Randy Newman and Harry Nilsson, who hid their acidic commentary within sturdy pop structures."

Pure Comedy received nominations for Best Alternative Music Album and Best Recording Package for its deluxe edition at the 60th Grammy Awards, winning the latter in a tie with Magín Díaz' El Orisha de la Rosa.

Accolades

Commercial performance
Pure Comedy debuted at number 10 on the Billboard 200 with 35,000 album-equivalent units, of which 33,000 were pure album sales.

Track listing

Personnel

Performance
 Josh Tillman - vocals, guitar, drums, percussion, etc. 
 Jonathan Wilson - keyboards, guitars, piano, drums, percussion, backing vocals, vibraphone, samples 
 Thomas Bartlett - piano, keyboards 
 Elijah Thomson - bass 
 Daniel Bailey - drums, percussion 
 Keefus Ciancia - keyboards, samples 
 Kyle Flynn - electric guitar 

Production
 Jonathan Wilson – production, mixing
 Josh Tillman – production, mixing
 Trevor Spencer – mixing, engineering
 Vira Byramji – additional engineering
 Dave Cerminara – additional engineering
 Rouble Kapoor – additional engineering
 Bryce Gonzales – additional engineering
 Bob Ludwig – mastering

Design
 Ed Steed – illustrations, art direction
 Sasha Barr – art direction, additional art and designs
 Josh Tillman – art direction

Arrangement
 Gavin Bryars – horn arrangement , string arrangement 
 James King – horn arrangement , additional horn arrangement 
 Josh Tillman – horn arrangement , additional horn arrangement , vocal arrangement 
 Paul Jacob Cartwright – string arrangement 
 Tom Lea – string arrangement 
 Nico Muhly – string arrangement 
 Chavonne Stewart – vocal arrangement 

Additional musicians
 George Potts Young – additional vocals 
 De'Ante Duckett – additional vocals 
 Ryan Stewart – additional vocals 
 Tiffanie Cross – additional vocals 
 Vanessa Grundy – additional vocals 
 Chavvone Stewart – additional vocals 
 Shanika Bereal – additional vocals 
 Celeste Young – additional vocals 
 Dominique Dubose – additional vocals 
 Greg Leisz – pedal steel , lap steel 
 Kelsey Lu – cello 
 Gavin Bryars – vibraphone

Charts
Pure Comedy reached the first position on the Billboard Rock Albums, Alternative Music, and Folk Music charts on the week of April 29, 2017, a first for Tillman.

Weekly charts

Year-end charts

References

2017 albums
Josh Tillman albums
Bella Union albums
Sub Pop albums
Albums produced by Jonathan Wilson (musician)
Albums produced by Josh Tillman